Rick Redewill (Richard Byron Redewill; 9 August 1952, in California – 14 April 1993) was the founder of the Lone Star Saloon, the gay bar which is credited as helping give birth to the Bear Community in San Francisco. He is buried in Georgetown, CA.

References

1952 births
1993 deaths
Bear (gay culture)
People from Columbia, California